The Paris Municipal Commission Ministry of 1830 was proclaimed by the Paris Municipal Commission on 31 July 1830, after the revolution in which the Bourbon Restoration monarchy was deposed. One day later, it was replaced by a provisional government named by Louis Philippe I of Orléans.

Formation

The Ordinances of 25 July 1830 suspended the constitution.
Paris was calm the next day, although there were stirrings of protest against the blows the ordinances had dealt against the powers of the legislators and the press.
Most of the deputies in Paris met at Casimir Pierre Périer's house on 27 July, but although they made speeches and were urged to act by Audry de Puyraveau, François Mauguin and Labbey de Pompières, they were unwilling to launch a protest.
The deputies from the Left met at Audry's house on 28 July.
On 29 July 1830 the deputies met at Jacques Laffitte's house and named an interim Municipal Commission composed of  Jacques Laffitte, Casimir Pierre Périer, Georges Mouton, Auguste de Schonen, Pierre-François Audry de Puyraveau and François Mauguin. General Lafayette was appointed commander of the National Guard.

Ministers
The Municipal Commission announced the ministers on 31 July 1830. They were:

Replacement

Louis Philippe entered Paris on 31 July 1830 and, according to Louis Blanc, "the revolution was betrayed".
The municipal commission and Lafayette created a movable National Guard, in which soldiers would be paid 30 sous per day. 
This was not put into effect, but served to help the people disperse and disarm.
Louis Philippe was declared Lieutenant-General of France on 31 July 1830.
On 2 August 1830 Charles X of France formally abdicated, and on 9 August 1830 Louis Philippe took the oath of office as King.

References
Citations

Sources

French governments
1830 establishments in France
1830 disestablishments in France
Cabinets established in 1830
Cabinets disestablished in 1830